Schleien is a surname. Notable people with the surname include:

Charles Schleien (born 1953), American pediatrician
Lior Schleien (born 1978), Israeli television producer